Turo may refer to:

People
 Ahmose called Turo
 Turo Asplund (born 1985), Finnish ice hockey player
 Turo Järvinen Järvinen, Finnish ice hockey player
 Turo Pajala (1955–2007), Finnish actor
 Turo Valenzona, Filipino basketball player and coach

Places
 Turo (village), Poland
 Turo-Gajówka, Poland
 David Lloyd Club Turó, Spain
 El Turó de la Peira, Spain

Other
 Turo, dialect of the Konso language
 Turo (company), American carsharing company
 Turo, another name for Quark (dairy product)
 Turo's Hevi Gee, Finnish band

See also